Fedorenko v. United States, 449 U.S. 490 (1981), was a United States Supreme Court case which held that people who assisted in Nazi persecutions, whether voluntarily or involuntarily, were not eligible for visas to enter the United States, and thus could not legally obtain United States citizenship. It has been used as an important precedent in many denaturalization cases against former Nazis.

Following the ruling, the defendant, Feodor Fedorenko, was deported to the Soviet Union. He was tried for treason, war crimes, and collaborationism for working in Treblinka extermination camp. Fedorenko was sentenced to death in 1986, and executed in 1987.

See also
Chaunt v. United States, 
Rogers v. Bellei, 
Kungys v. United States, 
Negusie v. Holder, 
 Boļeslavs Maikovskis, Latvian Nazi collaborator, fled the U.S. before his extradition
 Anton Geiser, who lost his US citizenship for similar reasons, this case having played an important part in the process

Further reading
.

External links
 

United States immigration and naturalization case law
United States Supreme Court cases
United States Supreme Court cases of the Burger Court
1981 in United States case law
German emigrants to the United States
Nazism
Denaturalization case law